The Kano State Executive Council (also known as, the Cabinet of Kano State) is the highest formal governmental body that plays important roles in the Government of Kano State headed by the Governor of Kano State. It consists of the Deputy Governor, Secretary to the State Government, Chief of Staff, Commissioners who preside over ministerial departments, and (with the consent of the legislative arm of the government) the Governor's special aides.

Functions

The Executive Council exists to advise and direct the Governor. Their appointment as members of the Executive Council gives them the authority to execute power over their fields.

Current cabinet

The current Executive Council are serving under the Dr. Abdullahi Umar Ganduje administration 2019 to date.

Historic councils

References

Kano
Kano State